State Trunk Highway 73 (often called Highway 73, STH-73 or WIS 73) is a  state highway  in the central part of the US state of Wisconsin that runs mostly north–south from Ingram to near Edgerton. The exception is in Wood and Adams counties, where this highway runs east–west. It is one of the longer Wisconsin state highways.

Route description

WIS 73 starts in Dane County at an interchange with Interstate 39 (I-39), I-90 (exit 160), US Highway 51 (US 51) north of the city of Edgerton. Also near this junction, WIS 106 meets WIS 73 east of Albion. WIS 73 heads north  where it meets US 12 and US 18. WIS 73 continues north and heads  to Deerfield.

Just before it goes under an overpass of US 151, it crosses into Columbia County. WIS 73 crosses US 151, WIS 89, WIS 16, WIS 60 and US 151 again, in that order, as it travels northeast through Columbus on Park Avenue and Ludington Street. It also crosses into Dodge County just after WIS 16/WIS 60.

Just north of town, it crosses WIS 33. WIS 73 continues to head north for four miles to a junction with WIS 44. The two routes head west, forming a wrong-way concurrency through the unincorporated town of Manchester for  before WIS 44 splits off to head to Kingston.  

WIS 23/WIS 73 overlaps to Princeton using Fulton Street and Main Street before WIS 23 splits southwest to Montello. WIS 73 then heads north-northwest, crossing into Marquette County at Eagle Road, to Neshkoro. WIS 73 will then cross into Waushara County just north of County Highway E, north of Neshkoro. WIS 73 continues north-northwest  to Wautoma, where it meets WIS 21. WIS 21/WIS 73 runs concurrently through downtown before WIS 21 splits off to head to Necedah.

It continues heading west, crossing into Adams County at County Highway D. WIS 73 straddles the Adams-Portage county line for about four miles. It then enters Wood County before WIS 73 continues west-northwest to WIS 13, where it has a brief overlap with WIS 13. WIS 73 continues west for four miles to the Wisconsin River where it enters the city of Nekoosa. In Nekoosa, WIS 73 has a junction with WIS 173. WIS 73 follows roughly along the west bank of the Wisconsin River into Port Edwards, where it meets with WIS 54. WIS 54 is cosigned with WIS 73 along the west bank of the Wisconsin River as they enter Wisconsin Rapids's southwest side.

At Riverview Expressway, they meet with WIS 13. WIS 54 heads to Plover while WIS 73 and WIS 13 are cosigned briefly before they split at WIS 34 (4th Avenue) and Grand Avenue. WIS 73 heads west-northwest out of town. It crosses WIS 186. WIS 73 meets WIS 80 in Pittsville where WIS 73/WIS 80 overlap for about two miles before WI 80 heads north to Marshfield.

WIS 73 heads west  to where it crosses into Clark County. WIS 73 heads north to Greenwood and Withee. Just before Withee, WIS 73 meets with the WIS 29 expressway, overlaps with it for about 10 miles to Thorp, where WIS 73 exits and heads north once again.

It goes north another seven miles to WIS 64. They are cosigned heading north before WIS 64 splits just east of Gilman. WIS 73 continues north to Jump River before entering Rusk County.

Major intersections

See also

References

External links

073
Transportation in Dane County, Wisconsin
Transportation in Columbia County, Wisconsin
Transportation in Dodge County, Wisconsin
Transportation in Green Lake County, Wisconsin
Transportation in Marquette County, Wisconsin
Transportation in Waushara County, Wisconsin
Transportation in Adams County, Wisconsin
Transportation in Portage County, Wisconsin
Transportation in Wood County, Wisconsin
Transportation in Clark County, Wisconsin
Transportation in Taylor County, Wisconsin
Transportation in Rusk County, Wisconsin